Dendromecon rigida, also called bush poppy or tree poppy, is a shrub or small tree of the Papaveraceae native to California and Baja California.

Distribution and habitat
Dendromecon rigida occurs in Northern California in the foothills of the California Coast Ranges, Klamath Mountains, southwest Cascade Range, and western Sierra Nevada in the Montane and Interior chaparral and woodlands and other habitats.

It is found in the foothills of the Transverse Ranges and Peninsular Ranges and in other areas, in Interior and Montane chaparral and woodlands and other habitats, in Southern California and northern Baja California Peninsula.

Plants grow on dry slopes and washes, and prefer areas that have just been burned.

Description

The leaves are alternate, narrow lanceolate, 3–10 cm long, more than three times as long as broad. The margin of the leaves is finely toothed. The plant is evergreen and the leaves are somewhat leathery to the touch.

The inflorescences are solitary and terminal.  The flowers are 2–7 cm diameter, with four satiny yellow petals.  Plants bloom in late winter to mid-spring.  The receptacle is funnel-shaped and surrounds the ovary base. Two sepals are shed when the flower blooms, and the petals are shed as well after pollination.  There are many free stamens. Flowers bloom April to June.

The fruits produced are cylindric and dehiscent from the base; the fruits measure 5–10 cm long.  The many seeds are smooth, brown or black, with a small pale outgrowth.

Varieties
Dendromecon rigida ssp. harfordii (former classification) — Channel Islands tree poppy; the current botanical name is Dendromecon harfordii.

Cultivation
Dendromecon rigida is cultivated as an ornamental plant by specialty plant nurseries. It is used in native plant and drought tolerant gardens and natural landscaping.

This poppy prefers fast draining soils but will grow well in clay soil if there is little to no water after it is established.  It has a pH tolerance from 6 to 8 and a rainfall tolerance of 31 to 90 cm. This bush also prefers to be in full sun.

References

External links

Jepson Manual Treatment of Dendromecon rigida
Dendromecon rigida — U.C. Photo Gallery

Papaveroideae
Flora of California
Flora of Baja California
Flora of the Cascade Range
Flora of the Klamath Mountains
Flora of the Sierra Nevada (United States)
Natural history of the California chaparral and woodlands
Natural history of the California Coast Ranges
Natural history of the Peninsular Ranges
Natural history of the Transverse Ranges
Garden plants of North America
Drought-tolerant plants
Flora without expected TNC conservation status